Lyciasalamandra atifi, or Atif's salamander, is a species of salamander in the family Salamandridae found only in Turkey. Its natural habitats are temperate forests and rocky areas. It is threatened by habitat loss.

References

atifi
Endemic fauna of Turkey
Taxonomy articles created by Polbot
Amphibians described in 1967